Alex De Rakoff (born 13 November 1970) is a British writer, producer, and director.

Personal life
In April 2005, he married American actress Monet Mazur. Together, they have two children. As of July 2018, the couple have filed for divorce.

Films
The Calcium Kid is a British comedy film which was released in 2004. The film is presented in the style of a fictional documentary or a "mockumentary". It stars Orlando Bloom as a milkman and amateur boxer. Billie Piper and Michael Peña are also featured. It is produced by Working Title Films.

Dead Man Running is a 2009 British crime film. A loan shark (Curtis '50 Cent' Jackson) gives ex-con Nick (Tamer Hassan) a period of 24 hours in order to pay back the money he owes. Up against it, Nick involves his best mate (Danny Dyer) on a multi-part mission in order to raise the cash before it is too late for them both.

Filmography

Films

TV series
Snatch (2017)

Video game
Need for Speed: The Run (2011)
Transformers Universe (2014)

Music videos
"If I Was Your Man" by Aswad (1995)
"The Bomb! (These Sounds Fall into My Mind)" by The Bucketheads (1995)
"Stayin' Alive" by N-Trance (1995)
"Boys Don't Cry" by Tekno Mafia (1996)
"Walk Like a Champion" by Kaliphz (1996)
"Afrika Jam" by Afrika Islam (1996)
"Got Myself Together" by The Bucketheads (1996)
"We Gotta Get out of This Place" by Space (1998)
"Official Chemical" by Dub Pistols (2001)
"Sympathy for the Devil" (The Neptunes Remix) by The Rolling Stones (2003)
"Another White Dash" by Butterfly Boucher (2004)
"Bubblin'" by Blue (2004)
"Sand in My Shoes" by Dido (2004)
"Since U Been Gone" by Kelly Clarkson (2004)
"High and Dry" by Jamie Cullum (2004)
"The Other Side" by Alana Grace (2005)
"Trumpets" by Flipsyde (2006)
"Gallery" by Mario Vazquez (2006)
"Will You Be Around" by Platinum Weird (2006)
"See Right Through Me" by Mobile (2006)

References 

Living people
1970 births
Film directors from London
British music video directors
English screenwriters
English male screenwriters